Terellia fuscicornis is a species of tephritid or fruit flies in the genus Neaspilota of the family Tephritidae.

Distribution
Europe, North Africa, Israel. Introduced to United States.

References

Tephritinae
Insects described in 1844
Diptera of Africa
Diptera of Europe